Czerteż  (Chertizh; , Chertezh) is a village in East Małopolska in the Lesser Beskid mountains, in the district called Gmina Sanok. It is situated below the main watershed at the foot of the Słonne Mountains, and has an elevation of 346 metres. Situated in the Subcarpathian Voivodship (since 1999), previously in Krosno Voivodship (1975–1998) and Sanok district, Sanok subdistrict (more than 4 miles/7 km west of Sanok), parish Kostarowce. In Czerteż is The Agricultural Production Cooperative "Unity"

History
Czerteż was founded in 1339 by prince Bolesław Jerzy II of Mazovia, and was originally named Czerteznyki ( en. Handicrafts ).

During 966 - 1018, 1340 - 1772 (Ruthenian Voivodeship) and during 1918 - 1939 Czertez was part of Poland. Between 1772 and 1918 it belonged to Austrian empire, later Austrian-Hungarian empire when double monarchy was introduced in Austria. It is the oldest settlement in the Sanoczek river-basin.

In 1785 the village lands comprised 3.36 km². There were 285 Catholics and 6 Jews.

Religion
In the center of the village there is a wooden Greek-Catholic church of the Transfiguration of Our Lord dating to 1742. It was renovated in 1877 and 1924. It is an excellent examples of Boyko architecture.

References

Villages in Sanok County
1339 establishments in Europe
14th-century establishments in Poland
Populated places established in the 1330s